Nosferattus occultus is a jumping spider.

Etymology
The epithet is Latin for "hidden" and refers to the embolus, which is hidden behind the edge of the tegulum.

Appearance
Males of N. occultus can be easily distinguished from the remaining species of the genus by the length of the embolus, coiled 3.5 times around the tegulum, and other characteristics.

Males are almost 4 mm long, with females slightly larger.

Distribution
N. occultus occurs in the States of Maranhão and Ceará in Brazil.

External links
Three new genera of jumping spider from Brazil (Araneae, Salticidae) (2005)

Sitticini
Spiders of Brazil
Spiders described in 2005